Saeid Abbasbandy is an Iranian mathematician and university professor at Imam Khomeini International University. Abbasbandy was born on March 17, 1967, in Tehran. He finished his high school course in Shariati High school and attended in the university entrance exam, then could enter University of Tehran.

His paper "Homotopy analysis method for quadratic Riccati differential equation" was singled out by Science Watch as a "Hot Paper in Mathematics" in March 2009.
Abbasbandy is editor-in-chief of a non-profit journal, Communications in Numerical Analysis.

Education
He received a Master of Science degree in September 1991 and a PhD in February 1996 from Kharazmi University. The title of his thesis was Numerical Galerkin Methods for Integral Equations of the First kind.

References

21st-century Iranian mathematicians
Kharazmi University alumni
Academic staff of Imam Khomeini International University
1967 births
Living people